Thomas Boakye (born 10 May 1993) is a Ghanaian footballer who plays as a defender or midfielder for Swedish club Halmstad.

Career

Boakye played college football for Hartpury College in England.

Before the 2012 season, he signed for Swedish third division side Östersund, helping them achieve promotion to the Swedish second division.

Before the 2018 season, he signed for Halmstad in the Swedish second division, helping them achieve promotion to the Swedish top flight.

References

External links
 
 

Ghanaian footballers
Expatriate footballers in Sweden
Ghanaian expatriate sportspeople in England
Ghanaian expatriate sportspeople in Sweden
Superettan players
Allsvenskan players
Living people
1993 births
Association football midfielders
Association football defenders
Halmstads BK players
Östersunds FK players
Varbergs BoIS players
Expatriate footballers in England
Ghanaian expatriate footballers
People from Ashanti Region